PPL or ppl may refer to:
 PPL (gene)
 PPL Building, an office building in Allentown, Pennsylvania 
 PPL Corporation, an American energy company
 PPL Center, a sports arena in Allentown, Pennsylvania
 PPL India, an Indian collective-rights management organization
 Phonographic Performance Limited, a British-based music licensing and performance rights organisation
 Pokhara Premier League, a Nepali cricket league
 Polymorphic Programming Language
 Private pilot licence
 ppl, short for "people"

See also 
 Participle